Keith Brooks may refer to:
 Keith Brooks (footballer) (1917–1981), Australian rules footballer
 Keith Brooks (Australian politician) (1888–1955)
 Keith Brooks (American politician)